The Women's 7.5 kilometre sprint biathlon competition at the 1994 Winter Olympics was held on 23 February, at Birkebeineren Ski Stadium. Each miss was penalized by requiring the competitor to race over a 150-metre penalty loop.

Results

References

Sports-Reference.com - Women's 7.5 km Sprint - 1994 Olympics

Women's biathlon at the 1994 Winter Olympics
Biath
Bia